"Paranoia" is a single from American rock band A Day to Remember, released on March 9, 2016.

Music video 
A music video for the song, directed by Ethan Lader, was released on 10 March 2016.

Track listing
"Paranoia" – 3:22

Chart positions

References

A Day to Remember songs
2016 singles
2016 songs